New England Mutiny is an American women's soccer club, which competes at the pro-am level of women's soccer in the US, in the United Women's Soccer league.

The club plays its home games at Lusitano Stadium.

Team history
Established in 1999 as Springfield Sirens, the club played in the amateur W-League. After winning the W-2 (second division) championship in 2000, the club played one more season in the W-League, then a season as an exhibition team before changing the team name to the New England Mutiny and accepting promotion to WPSL as one of the founding members of the East Division.

On July 29, 2004, in a match preparing women's national team of China for international tournament, the Mutiny surprised the fifth ranked team in the world, in front of 3000 fans in Agawam, Massachusetts, with a 3–1 lead, and losing 4–3 only in the final minutes. The Mutiny consider this match one of their two crowning achievements.

After the folding of WPS in 2012, the club joined the new Women's Premier Soccer League Elite, which included three former WPS teams.  Although they finished fifth out of the eight WPSLE teams, they recorded wins over the Chicago Red Stars and Boston Breakers as well as a draw at the Western New York Flash – the former WPS teams – in the last month of the season.  Their win over the Breakers is the first occurrence of an amateur side beating a professional side in US women's soccer, (Chicago fielded an amateur roster in WPSLE,) and is the second of the Mutiny's crowning achievements.  WPSL-Elite lasted just one year as the former WPS teams joined the newly formed National Women's Soccer League, while the remaining teams either folded or, like the Mutiny, returned to the WPSL in 2013.

The Mutiny spent three further years in the WPSL, but after dissatisfaction with playoff procedures and handling in the WPSL, the team branched off to join the inaugural 2016 season of United Women's Soccer.

Players
The following former players have played at the senior international and/or professional level:
 Sylvia Gee (Springfield Sirens)
 Sonya Maher (Springfield Sirens)
 Geraldine O'Shea (Springfield Sirens)
 Margaret Saurin (Springfield Sirens)
 Claire Scanlan (Springfield Sirens)

Year-by-year

Honors
 W-2 North Division regular season champions (2): 1999, 2000
 W-2 National Champions (1): 2000
 WPSL divisional regular season champions (6): 2003, 2004, 2005, 2007, 2013, 2015
 WPSL East Regional Champions (5): 2003, 2004, 2005, 2007, 2008, 2013
 WPSL National Runners-up (2): 2004, 2007

Coaches
  Tony Horta 2007–2014
  Joe Abele 2015–present

Stadia
 Harmon Smith Stadium, Agawam, Massachusetts -present

References

External links
 Official Site
 UWS Page

United Women's Soccer teams
Women's Premier Soccer League teams
Women's Premier Soccer League Elite teams
Women's soccer clubs in the United States
Soccer clubs in Massachusetts
Association football clubs established in 1999
1999 establishments in Massachusetts
Ludlow, Massachusetts
Sports in Hampden County, Massachusetts